Tricetin is a flavone, a type of flavonoid. It is a rare aglycone found in the pollen of members of the Myrtaceae, subfamily Leptospermoideae, such as Eucalyptus globulus. This compound shows anticancer effects on human breast adenocarcinoma MCF-7 cells. Moreover. a potent anti-inflammatory effect of tricetin has also been demonstrated in a model of acute pancreatitis. This observation was explained by the compound's radical scavenging effects, its inhibitory effect on the DNA damage sensor enzyme poly (ADP-ribose) polymerase-1 (PARP1) and PARP1-mediated cell death and suppression of inflammatory gene expression.

See also 
 Tricin synthase produces tricin or tricetin 3′,5′-dimethyl ether
 Tricetin 3′,4′,5′-O-trimethyltransferase

References 

Flavones